Tory Awatere Whanau (born 1983) is a New Zealand politician. She was elected mayor of Wellington at the 2022 election. Previously she served as the parliamentary chief of staff for the Green Party. 

Whanau is the first person of Māori descent to be mayor of Wellington.

Early life and career
Whanau has ancestors from Pakakohi and Ngāruahine. She was born in Porirua in 1983 and grew up in Cannons Creek, Porirua.  Whanau moved with her family to Patea at the age of 8, later attending New Plymouth Girls' High School. Whanau moved to Wellington as an adult to study, and in 2003 won $1.39 million in a Lotto draw, which she used to pay off her parents' mortgage, support her family, and travel. Whanau graduated with a Bachelor of Arts from Victoria University of Wellington in 2006, and began working in the financial sector. In 2012, she graduated with a Postgraduate Diploma in Business and Administration in Communication Management from Massey University.

Political career

Parliament
Whanau entered politics in 2015 when she began working for the parliamentary wing of the Green Party of Aotearoa New Zealand. During the 2017 general election, she was the party's digital director and became acting chief of staff when Deborah Morris-Travers resigned in August 2017. After the 2017 and 2020 elections, Whanau was a member of the Green Party's team in the negotiations that led to the formations of the resulting government. Whanau resigned as chief of staff in August 2021, intending to form a public relations consultancy firm with Matthew Tukaki, Deborah Mahuta-Coyle and Nevada Halbert, but instead joined the firm Capital Government Relations.

Mayor of Wellington
Whanau announced her intention on 18 November 2021 to run for the Wellington mayoralty in the 2022 election, and formally launched her campaign on 30 June 2022. She ran as an independent, endorsed by the Green party. She gained the mayoralty with 34,462 votes after the distribution of preferences, more than twice those gained by the incumbent Andy Foster.

Whanau's stated policy platform was "Fixing our pipes; More warm, dry homes for all; More efficient public transport options; Mental health support, alcohol and harm reduction; Safer streets; Arts and culture revitalisation; Business support; Climate action." She was seen as one of the few progressive candidates to gain mayoral office in the 2022 local elections, with most New Zealand territorial authorities swinging to conservative candidates.

Following the 2022 Wellington local elections, Whanau reduced the number of full council committees on the Wellington City Council from five to three. Following a month of negotiations and restructuring, she appointed several Labour and Green councillors as chairs of these three council committees (Rebecca Matthews, Teri O'Neill and Tamatha Paul). Whanau did not renew her Green membership when it came up for renewal in November 2022. Georgina Campbell from The New Zealand Herald wrote that this was in order to build better relationships with independent councillors without a formal party membership.

References

1983 births
Living people
Mayors of Wellington
Victoria University of Wellington alumni
Massey University alumni
Green Party of Aotearoa New Zealand politicians
21st-century New Zealand women politicians
People from Porirua
Ngāti Ruapani people
Ngāruahine people
Political chiefs of staff
Māori mayors
Women mayors of places in New Zealand
Lottery winners
People educated at New Plymouth Girls' High School